The 1984–85 Kentucky Wildcats men's basketball team represented University of Kentucky in the 1984–85 NCAA Division I men's basketball season. Head coach Joe B. Hall led his team to end his final coaching season with an overall record of 18–13.

References 

Kentucky Wildcats men's basketball seasons
Kentucky
Kentucky
Kentucky Wildcats
Kentucky Wildcats